The Wrangell Sentinel is a weekly newspaper founded in 1902 in Wrangell, Alaska. The newspaper remains in publication with only a few short periods of inactivity. It is the oldest continuously published newspaper in Alaska.

The paper covered potlach traditional celebrations.

The paper went through a brief bankruptcy in 1995 before its former publisher, who was also the paper's largest creditor, took back control. Former Sentinel employee Jamie Bryson launched the Petersburg Press in 1974

History
The paper began in 1902 with the first issue published November 2 as the Alaska Sentinel. In 1903 it was listed in the Governor of Alaska's report to the Department of the Interior as one of the newspapers in Alaska and again in 1904. A 1906 congressional report from the U.S. Government Printing office reported the Sentinel was among 23 papers in Alaska in 14 towns.

The paper's name was changed in 1909 when Richard Bushell was induced to takeover the paper. Leonard P. Dawes took over the paper two years later.

August 19, 1920, the editor of the Sentinel, J. W. Pritchett, received a copy of the New York Times sent by plane, the first piece of mail to arrive in Alaska by plane.

Mrs. Pritchett took over running the paper in 1930 when her husband became ill. She was the paper's editor and publisher for 8 years.

Lew Williams Jr. and his wife Winnie Williams ran the paper for many years until 1965. He also published other newspapers in  Alaska and was also the mayor of Petersburg, Alaska.

Charles Willis, a former president of Alaska Airlines, also ran the paper for some time.

The current publishers are Anne and Ron Loesch.

References

External links 

Newspapers published in Alaska
Publications established in 1902
1902 establishments in Alaska